Isaias Andberhian (born 28 January 1984) is an Eritrean footballer. He currently plays for the Eritrea national football team.

International career
Andberhian played in the 2009 CECAFA Cup in Kenya, scoring in the 3–1 victory against Somalia

References

External links

1984 births
Living people
Eritrean footballers
Eritrea international footballers
Association football forwards